Lightning Carson Rides Again is a 1938 American Western film directed by Sam Newfield.

Cast 
Tim McCoy as "Lightning Bill" Carson / Jose
Joan Barclay as Sally, Paul Smith's Sweetheart
Ted Adams as Gang leader Chuck
Bob Terry as Paul Smith, Carson's Nephew
Forrest Taylor as Gunfight Henchman
Ben Corbett as Henchman Shorty
Slim Whitaker as Hogan, Saloon Owner
Frank Wayne as Bank Cashier
Jane Keckley as Katherine Smith, Carson's Sister
Karl Hackett as Gray (Banker)
Reed Howes as Henchman Jimmy
Frank LaRue as Sheriff Armstrong
James Flavin as Justice Department Agent

External links 

1938 films
1930s English-language films
American black-and-white films
1938 Western (genre) films
American Western (genre) films
Films directed by Sam Newfield
1930s American films